The iron meteorites of the IIE chemical type are octahedrites of various coarseness, most of which contain numerous inclusions of recrystallized stony silicates.

Composition and origin
They have mineral compositions and oxygen isotope ratios very similar to the H chondrites, which makes it probable that they originate from the same parent body. The best candidate for this parent body is the S-type asteroid 6 Hebe. Unlike most iron meteorites, the type IIE are thought to have been melted out of the chondritic surface of the parent asteroid by impacts during its early history.

Rarity
It is a rare type with 24 known members as of 2020.

See also
 Glossary of meteoritics

References